Cameron Fromanteel "Kim" Cobbold, 1st Baron Cobbold  (14 September 1904 – 1 November 1987) was a British banker. He served as Governor of the Bank of England from 1949 to 1961 and as Lord Chamberlain from 1963 to 1971.

Early life
Born in London in 1904 to Clement John Fromanteel Cobbold and his wife Stella Willoughby Savile Cameron, Cobbold was educated at Eton College. He also spent one year at King's College, Cambridge.

Career

Bank of England
Cobbold joined the Bank of England at the invitation of bank Governor Montagu Norman in 1933. He was appointed Deputy Governor in 1945 and became governor in 1949. During his tenure he was sworn of the Privy Council (1959) and was created Baron Cobbold, of Knebworth in the County of Hertford (1960). He retired as governor in 1961.

Cobbold Commission
He subsequently led the Cobbold Commission in 1962 which studied the question of North Borneo and Sarawak's merger with Malaya to form Malaysia. In 1963, he was appointed a Knight Grand Cross of the Royal Victorian Order and Lord Chamberlain to Queen Elizabeth II. He served until 1971, and during his tenure the Lord Chamberlain's theatrical censorship role was abolished (1968) and he was appointed to the Order of the Garter (1970). Cobbold was appointed to be a Deputy Lieutenant of the County of Hertford (1972).

In 1966, he received the Grand Decoration in Gold with Sash for Services to the Republic of Austria.

Marriage and children
On 3 April 1930, Cobbold married Lady Hermione Millicent Bulwer-Lytton, daughter and heir of Victor Bulwer-Lytton, 2nd Earl of Lytton.  Their seat was at Knebworth House in Hertfordshire. They had two daughters and two sons:

 Jane Cobbold (10 May 1931 - 16 February 1937)
 Hon Susan Victoria Cobbold (born 24 May 1933)
 David Antony Fromanteel Lytton-Cobbold, 2nd Baron Cobbold (14 July 1937 - 9 May 2022)
 Hon Rowland John Fromanteel Cobbold (born 20 June 1944)

Lord Cobbold died at Knebworth in November 1987, aged 83.  He was succeeded in the barony by his elder son, David.

References

Further reading
Clive Hodges: Cobbold & Kin: Life Stories from an East Anglian Family (Woodbridge, Boydell Press, 2014)

References
  

1904 births
1987 deaths
Businesspeople from London
People educated at Eton College
Alumni of King's College, Cambridge
Knights of the Garter
Knights Grand Cross of the Royal Victorian Order
Recipients of the Grand Decoration with Sash for Services to the Republic of Austria
Members of the Privy Council of the United Kingdom
Governors of the Bank of England
Permanent Lords-in-Waiting
Cameron
Deputy Lieutenants of Hertfordshire
High Sheriffs of the County of London
Deputy Governors of the Bank of England
People from Knebworth
1
Hereditary barons created by Elizabeth II
20th-century English businesspeople